María Eugenia Guzmán (born 8 September 1945) is an Ecuadorian former professional tennis player.

Tennis career
Guzmán won two medals for Ecuador at the 1967 Pan American Games held in Winnipeg. She was a silver medalist in the women's doubles with Ana María Ycaza and got a bronze in the mixed doubles partnering Pancho Guzmán.

At the 1968 Summer Olympics in Mexico City, Guzmán took part in the demonstration and exhibition tennis tournaments, for third place finishes in both the women's singles and doubles exhibitions.

Guzmán's best performances in grand slam tournaments were third round appearances at the 1969 French Open and 1970 Wimbledon Championships.

In 1972, towards the end of Guzmán's career, Ecuador entered the Federation Cup for the first time and she featured in all four ties. It was the only occasion that Ecuador have reached the second round of the World Group.

References

External links
 
 
 
 

1945 births
Living people
Ecuadorian female tennis players
Pan American Games silver medalists for Ecuador
Pan American Games bronze medalists for Ecuador
Pan American Games medalists in tennis
Tennis players at the 1967 Pan American Games
Tennis players at the 1968 Summer Olympics
Tennis players at the 1963 Pan American Games
Medalists at the 1967 Pan American Games
20th-century Ecuadorian women
21st-century Ecuadorian women